Noel John Whittaker AM (born 1940) is a writer and newspaper columnist. Whittaker has written 22 books, including Making Money Made Simple. Whittaker writes columns in major Australian newspapers, including The Age, The Sunday Mail (Brisbane), the Sydney Morning Herald, and The Sunday Times (Perth). He also writes for magazines and broadcasts on the radio.

For 30 years, he was the director of financial planning firm Whittaker Macnaught (which closed in 2013). He has a degree in accountancy.

Awards
 Australian Investment Planner of the Year (1988)
 Australian Centenary Medal (2003)
 Member of the Order of Australia (2011)

Books
25 Years Of Whitt & Wisdom
Aged Care, Who Cares?
Getting It Together
Golden Rules Of Wealth
Making Money Made Simple: New Edition
Money Tips – The Abc Of Money Matters
The Beginner’$ Guide To Wealth
The Retirement Living Handbook
The Self Managed Super Handbook
Winning Property Tax Strategies

References

External links
 Sydney Morning Herald column
 Official Website

Australian financial writers
Australian businesspeople
Living people
Recipients of the Centenary Medal
Members of the Order of Australia
21st-century Australian writers
1940 births